SURGEtv, also known as Surge Television and formerly SUSUtv, is a student television station that serves the students of the University of Southampton. The station was commissioned in 2006 and is a union group within the University of Southampton Students' Union, alongside its sister radio station Surge Radio. The station has produced and aired a variety of different programmes, including news coverage, special event programming, and original short films and series. Notable shows and films include the 2013 fantasy series Elfrida and the 2015 documentary The Gay Word. The station shows their videos through YouTube and Facebook.

History

SUSUtv: Early years (2006-13) 
The origins of SUSUtv began when the idea was originally submitted in 2001 but was rejected at the time. The idea resurfaced in 2006 when the union began to start producing video for their website. As a result, SUSUtv was formed in 2007 so that students could make these ever more ambitious videos. The following year the station joined the NaSTA. In 2010 the station adopted its current logo and bright green colour scheme, moved to its first studio in the bottom of the Students' Union building. The station was the first student television station to broadcast in HD for their 2010 sabbatical elections special.

SUSUtv: Short films and award wins (2013-20) 
Between 2013 and 2016, the station successfully crowdfunded and produced the fantasy drama Elfrida, and aired documentaries such as The Gay Word. These combined have received over 100,000 views on social media channels.

In 2016, in line with the rebrand of the SUSU organisation as "Us.", the station briefly rebranded to UStv. This name change was never formalised and fell out of use fairly quickly. 2017 saw the largest graphical rebrand of the station to date, introducing the iteration of the "S" power button logo still in use today. 2017-20 is regarded as one of the most productive periods for the station, with a distinctive pivot towards short films and news content. Shorts such as December Heat and the award-winning Constellations were made during this time.

The lockdowns following the COVID-19 pandemic coincided with a loss of station members, partially due to many graduating during this period. 2019 and 2020 both saw live coverage of national elections in the UK and US.

SURGEtv (2021-) 

SURGEtv officially announced its rebranding in August 2021, shortly before Freshers 2021. It has announced increased development of live broadcasts and, for the first time in the station's history, consistent original programming.

Awards

Over the years, SUSUtv has won a number of awards including at a national level at the annual NaSTA Awards.

References

External links
SUSUtv website
SUSU Media page
University of Southampton 60 years - Success No. 27
University of Southampton 60 years - Success No. 30

Student television stations in the United Kingdom
University of Southampton